Anja Kosan (born 12 December 2002) is a German rhythmic gymnast. She won silver in the senior team category at the 2022 World Championships.

Personal life 
In mid-2021 she moved from Berlin to Schmiden in Germany in order to train and study at the national gymnastics training centre, trying to achieve her dream of competing at the 2024 Olympic Games. "I didn't have to worry about finding accommodation either. I moved into a shared flat provided by the STB. The move was a little less stressful for me thanks to the help of my family. The new life at university was a bit difficult for me at first, as it is very different from school. In the meantime, however, I find my way around very well."

Career 
Kosan was selected as a for the 2022 Rhythmic Gymnastics European Championships in Tel Aviv, Israel, the group came in 12th place in the all-around. In the team ranking (individual and group), the German team placed 5th.  In late August Anja debuted in competition at the World Cup in Cluj-Napoca, winning bronze in the 3 ribbons + 2 balls' final. The following month She participated at the 2022 World Championships in Sofia, Bulgaria, the group made mistakes in the 5 hoops routine (that was scored 25.950) relegated them in 14th place in the All-Around, but they qualified for the 3 ribbons + 2 balls' final with the 6th score, the same place they ended up in the final. Following Bulgaria and Israel's withdrawal Germany was able to medal in the team competition, Hannah and her teammates Francine Schöning, Daniella Kromm, Alina Oganesyan, Hannah Vester and the two individuals Margarita Kolosov and Darja Varfolomeev were awarded silver for their results.

References 

2002 births
Living people
German rhythmic gymnasts
Medalists at the Rhythmic Gymnastics World Championships
21st-century German women